Dicamay Agta is an extinct Aeta language of the northern Philippines. The Dicamay Agta lived on the Dicamay River, on the western side of the Sierra Madre near Jones, Isabela. The Dicamay Agta were killed by Ilocano homesteaders sometime between 1957 and 1974 (Lobel 2013:98).

Richard Roe collected a Dicamay word list of 291 words in 1957.

References

Aeta languages
Northern Luzon languages
Extinct languages of Asia